Dylan Wu (born July 26, 1996) is an American professional golfer.

College career
Wu played college golf for the Northwestern Wildcats, winning three individual tournaments in four years. He and the 2017–18 Northwestern golf team played in the 2018 NCAA Division I Men's Golf Championship, but they were eliminated in the team competition.

Professional career
Wu turned professional at the conclusion of his college career and joined the third-tier PGA Tour Canada. He earned limited status on the Korn Ferry Tour for 2019 by reaching the final stage of Q School. In June 2019 his status yielded a start in the Lincoln Land Championship, in which he finished second, losing in a playoff to Zhang Xinjun. This result enabled him to play on the Korn Ferry Tour for the rest of the season; he finished 72nd on the regular-season points list, earning a spot in the Korn Ferry Tour Finals and fully-exempt status for the 2020 season.

On June 8, 2021, Wu qualified at the Woodmont Country Club in Rockville, Maryland for the 2021 U.S. Open.

Amateur wins
2011 Emerson Junior Classic
2012 Oregon Junior Stroke Play
2013 AJGA Junior at Centennial
2014 Gifford Collegiate-CordeValle
2017 SU Invite, UNCG Grandover Collegiate

Source:

Professional wins (1)

Korn Ferry Tour wins (1)

Korn Ferry Tour playoff record (0–1)

Results in major championships

"T" = Tied

Results in The Players Championship

"T" indicates a tie for a place

See also
2021 Korn Ferry Tour Finals graduates

References

External links

American male golfers
Northwestern Wildcats men's golfers
PGA Tour golfers
Golfers from Oregon
Golfers from Illinois
Sportspeople from Medford, Oregon
Sportspeople from Evanston, Illinois
1996 births
Living people